Bonfire is a five-disc box set by Australian rock band AC/DC, released in 1997, and remastered with a release in Digipak format in 2003. It was originally conceived to mark what would have been the 50th birthday of Bon Scott, the band's previous lead vocalist who died of alcohol-related misadventure in 1980. The release includes the two disc soundtrack for the film Let There Be Rock, a live recording from the Atlantic Records studio in New York, some previously unreleased early material and a remastered version of the 1980 Back in Black album.

Overview
The album was originally released in 1997 with the CDs all packaged individually in jewel cases, complete with full artwork. The original issue also features a poster, a backstage pass, keyring and a few other extras depending on the region. When the album was reissued in 2003, it was packaged in a large digipak, similar to a longbox, which featured either four- or five-disc trays. The four-tray versions contained the remastered Back in Black in its own case with booklet. All versions of the box feature a large book full of liner notes and rare pictures of the band, mostly from before Scott's death.

The boxset was the subject of a bit of derision from AC/DC fans for its limited content and select few rarities. AC/DC defended the release, stating that there was very little recorded by Scott that was not already released.

Track listing

Live from the Atlantic Studios
Recorded live on 7 December 1977 at the Atlantic Recording Studios, New York, New York.

Let There Be Rock: The Movie - Live in Paris
Recorded live on 9 December 1979 at the Pavillon de Paris, Paris, France.

Volts

Back in Black

References

AC/DC compilation albums
Albums produced by Robert John "Mutt" Lange
Albums produced by Harry Vanda
Albums produced by George Young (rock musician)
1997 compilation albums
Elektra Records compilation albums